Johanna Liesbeth Kubelka Döbereiner (28 November 1924 – 5 October 2000) was a Brazilian agronomist,pioneer in soil biology

Biography
Döbereiner was born in Ústí nad Labem, Czechoslovakia on the 28 November 1924. Her family were German Czechoslovakians from Aussig in Bohemia (at that time was Austria–Hungary Empire and now is Czech Republic), who left the country after World War II. Her father was Professor Paul Kubelka. Her name Döbereiner came from her husband Jürgen Döbereiner, who she met in Munich. Interestingly, her name became similar to the famous chemist Johann Wolfgang Döbereiner, who was born in Hof, Bavaria, in the border with Bohemia.

Johanna Döbereiner received her degree from the Ludwig Maximilian University of Munich, but settled in Brazil and became a Brazilian citizen in 1956. Her early work includes studies of Azospirillum and other bacteria that could be useful to Brazilian soil. She later played an important role in Brazil's soybean production by encouraging a reliance on varieties that solely depended on biological nitrogen fixation.

As a consequence of her research and ideas, numerous soybean plantations in Brazil are now completely supplied for nitrogen (N) by rhizobia and not using any N-fertilizers. This movement has had big benefits, because Brazil, together with the U.S., are the main producers of soybean in the world (ca. 50% world production). Considering that soybeans are one of the most important global sources of protein (mainly fed to animals that in turn becomes animal protein for human consumption), this implies that significant amount of global protein comes from an ecological biological process without the use of industrial chemical fertilizers.

This was one of the reasons that Johanna Döbereiner was indicated for the Nobel Prize in the 1990s.

The Johanna Döbereiner Biological Resources Center was named in her honour in 2017.

See also 
 Timeline of women in science
 Ana Maria Primavesi

References 

1924 births
2000 deaths
People from Ústí nad Labem
Czechoslovak emigrants to Brazil
Brazilian agronomists
Brazilian women scientists
Brazilian scientists
Sudeten German people
Women agronomists
TWAS fellows
20th-century women scientists
Ludwig Maximilian University of Munich alumni
Recipients of the National Order of Scientific Merit (Brazil)
Naturalized citizens of Brazil
20th-century agronomists